Cullen Wilkerson (born September 7, 2004), is an American soccer player who plays as a midfielder for Portland Timbers 2 via the Portland Timbers academy.

Club career
After playing with the Portland Timbers academy from 2019, Wilkerson appeared for Portland's USL Championship side Portland Timbers 2 on August 3, 2020 as an 82nd-minute substitute in a 4–0 loss to rivals Tacoma Defiance.

References

External links
 

2004 births
Living people
Association football midfielders
American soccer players
Portland Timbers 2 players
Soccer players from California
USL Championship players
Sportspeople from Richmond, California